Maricaona is a genus of moths in the family Tortricidae. It consists of only one species, Maricaona maricaonana, which is found in Puerto Rico in the Caribbean Sea.

The wingspan is about 14.5 mm for males and 16 mm for females. The ground color of the forewings is white, preserved in the form of a large postmedian blotch at the costa. The proximal half of the wing is brownish gray with brown, diffuse strigulation (fine streaks). The dorsal third of the wing is brownish white with brown-gray suffusions and spots. The hindwings are gray, but paler basally.

Etymology
The generic name refers to the name of the type locality of the type species. The species name refers to Maricao, Puerto Rico, the type locality.

References

Cochylini
Tortricidae genera
Monotypic moth genera